Jesse Francis McClendon (December 21, 1880 – November 22, 1976) was an American chemist, zoologist, and physiologist known for the first pH measurement of human stomach in situ.

Jesse F. McClendon made substantial contributions in a variety of fields, including invertebrate zoology, nutrition, life processes of cell membranes, the importance of pH control, the role of iodine in human health, and specifically its relation to prevention of goiters.

In the early 1930s Jesse F. McClendon tested the healthfulness of hamburgers by putting a University of Minnesota medical student on diet of only hamburgers and water for 13 weeks.

Biography 
Jesse F. McClendon was born in Lanett, Alabama. He married in 1911 and had two children in this marriage. McClendon married a second time in 1936. He died on November 22, 1976 in Harleysville, Pennsylvania.

He completed his B.S. in 1903 and M.S. in 1904, both from the University of Texas. In 1903 he worked in University of Texas under Dr. William Morton Wheeler.

Then he received a Ph.D. in zoology from the University of Pennsylvania in 1906.  He wrote a PhD dissertation entitled, "On the Development of Parasitic Copepoda."

1907–1910: McClendon taught biology at Randolph-Macon College, then zoology at the University of Missouri.

1910–1914: McClendon was Assistant, Instructor in histology and embryology of the Weill Cornell Medical College of Cornell University. He investigated frog blastomeres.

1914–1939: McClendon worked at Physiological Laboratory of the University of Minnesota Medical School, Minneapolis (1920–1939—he was Professor of Physiological Chemistry). In the Laboratory McClendon realized some pioneer researches, including low iodine-goiter relationship and Micromanipulation—Frog egg development.

Description of McClendon pH-probe 

In measuring the acidity of the gastric contents, it was found possible to lower an electrode into the stomach. The apparatus designed for work on the stomach contents consists chiefly of a rubber tube 60 cm. long and 3 mm. bore, and two No. 40 silk covered copper wires, that were coated with rubber cement and dried several times. One wire, M, extends through the rubber tube, JJ, and the other, N, passes down outside of it until by entering the hole, E, it connects with a platinum wire that is fused into the lower end of a short piece of glass tube that is inserted into the rubber tube. The lower end of the glass tube and copper-platinum junction is covered with sealing wax, A. A drop of pure mercury is dropped into the lower end of the glass tube so as to connect with the platinum wire at the level of B. Above the mercury a little calomel washed with concentrated KCl solution, C, is placed, and the rest of the glass tube packed with moist KC1 crystals, D, and the hole, E, stuffed with cotton soaked in KC1 solution. This forms a calomel electrode, and is separated off from the remainder of the tube by a short piece of glass rod, F. Above F several holes are cut in the rubber tube at the level of G, and from this point a fine platinized platinum wire extends through the lumen of the tube and is held in place by fusion to a bump on the inside of a short piece of glass tube at the level of I. This platinum wire then connects with the wire M and the junction is coated with rubber. The rubber tube is connected at K with a tube, L, leading from a hydrogen generator, and a slow stream of H2 passes down the rubber tube and out at G, thus converting the platinum wire from H to F into a hydrogen electrode.

References

External links 
 
  Jesse F. McClendon papers, 1910s-1960s. University of Minnesota Archives
  The Portrait of J.F.McClendon on 1905
 Minneapolis Department. History

1880 births
1976 deaths
University of Pennsylvania alumni
People from Lanett, Alabama
American physiologists
20th-century American chemists
University of Texas at Austin alumni
University of Missouri faculty
University of Minnesota faculty
Randolph–Macon College faculty